A Treasure trove is a hidden store of valuables. 

It may also refer to:

Treasure Trove, a solitare card game
A Treasure's Trove, a children's book
Shovel Knight, a collection of video games entitled Shovel Knight: Treasure Trove

See also
Treasure Trove Reviewing Committee
 Trove (disambiguation)